Papilio gigon is a butterfly of the family Papilionidae. It is confined to islands in eastern Indonesia (Sulawesi, Sula and Talaud), but common where found [1].

The wingspan is 120–130 mm.

The larvae feed on Citrus species and Euodia latifolia, Euodia roxburghiana, and Glycosmis pentaphylla.

Subspecies
Papilio gigon gigon (Sulawesi)
Papilio gigon mangolinus Fruhstorfer, 1899 (Sula Islands)
Papilio gigon neriotes Rothschild, 1908 (Talaud, Sangir)

External links

 Papilionidae of the World: a pictorial summary

gigon
Butterflies described in 1864